Dhamtari is a municipal corporation and headquarters of the Dhamtari district in the state of Chhattisgarh, India, which is part of the Mahasamund Lok Sabha constituency formed on 6July 1998.. The district is home to 3.13 percent of Chhattisgarh's total population.

History 

Dhamtari's population was 17,278 in 1955. At that time, the town was part of Raipur District in the state of Madhya Pradesh. In 2000, it became part of the new Chhattisgarh state and headquarters for the Dhamtari tehsil. Goods shipped from there included timber, shellac, morabulum nuts, beedi leaves (for cigarettes), rice and animal hides.

The American Mennonite Mission was established in Dhamtari in 1899. By 1952 the mission had merged with the Mennonite Church in India (MC), which had its headquarters in Dhamtari. In 1955 the 558-member congregation was one of several missionary groups in Dhamtari, including the Dhamtari Christian Academy, Dhamtari Christian Hospital, the Samuel Burkhard Memorial Boys' Orphanage and a nursing school. At the present Dhamtari is a "Nagar Nigam" .Dhamtari is also famous for its Maratha community which Is one of the biggest gathering of Maratha's in any state of India

Geography 
Dhamtari is in the fertile plains of Chhattisgarh. It is bordered by the Raipur and Durg districts to the north, the Gariaband district to the east, the Kondagaon district and the State of Orissa to the south and the Balod and Kanker districts to the west. The fertility of the land in the Dhamtari District is due to the Mahanadi River and its tributaries (Sendur, Pairy, Sondur, Joan, Kharun, and Shivnath).dhamtari is situated 65 km from capital Raipur.

Economy 
Lead deposits exist in the district. Most of the city's workforce is involved in the timber industry or rice or flour milling (Dhamtari has more than 200 rice mills), with the chemical industry also a significant presence. Asia's first siphon dam was built in 1914 at Madamsilli; the Sondhur and Dudhawa Dams are other important works.

List of mayors

Education 
Schools

 Anjuman Higher Secondary School,
 Azim Premji School, Shankardah,
 Delhi Public School
 Govt. Boys Higher Secondary School, 
 Govt. Girls Higher Secondary School,
 Hari Om Higher Secondary School,
 Kendriya Vidyalaya
 Mennonite Senior Secondary School,
 Model English Higher Secondary School,
 Nutan Higher Secondary School,
 Saraswati Shishu Mandir Higher Secondary School,
 Saraswati Shishu Vidya Mandir,
 Sarvoooodaayaa Hindi School,
 St. Marys English Medium School,
 St. Xaviers School,
 Vidya Kunj Memorial school.

Colleges

 Comp tech Degree College
 Genesis College
 Govt. Girls College
 Govt. P.G. College
 Govt. Polytechnic College
 KL College of Horticulture
 Vandemataram College

Transport

Railways and bus 
Dhamtari situated at Raipur to Jagdalpur national highway National Highway 30 (India), where majorly flawless fast Bus services is available almost 24 hours in every 5–15 minutes. Raipur to Dhamtari narrow-gauge line,now defunct provided service to the area, soon to be replaced by broad-gauge railway tracks.

Healthcare 

 Dhamtari Christian Hospital (DCH)
 Dhamtari District Hospital (DDH)

Media 
Newspapers

 Prakhar Samachar

Places of interest 

 Gangrel Dam 
Khubchand Baghel (Rudri) barrage
Bilai Mata Mandir (Vindhyavasini Mata)

Notable people associated with Dhamtari 

 Babu Chhote Lal Shrivastava

References

External links 
 Official Dhamtari government site

Cities and towns in Dhamtari district